Uch Tappeh (also Romanized as Ūch Tappeh and Owch Tappeh) is a village in Sardaran Rural District, in the Central District of Kabudarahang County, Hamadan Province, Iran. At the 2006 census, its population was 55, in 12 families.

References 

Populated places in Kabudarahang County